The 2009 European Youth Baseball Championship was an international baseball competition held in Brno, Czech Republic from July 7 to 11, 2009. It featured teams from Austria, Czech Republic, Germany, Italy, Netherlands, Russia, Slovakia and Ukraine.

In the end the team from Italy won the tournament.

Group stage

Pool A

Standings

Game results

Pool B

Standings

Game results

Final round

Pool C

Standings

Game results

Semi-finals

3rd place

Final

Final standings

External links
Game Results

References

European Youth Baseball Championship
European Youth Baseball Championship
2009
2009 in Czech sport